Gymnoscelis semialbida is a moth in the family Geometridae. It is found on Borneo.

Taxonomy
The species belongs to a species complex clustered around Gymnoscelis imparatalis.

References

Moths described in 1866
semialbida
Moths of Japan